Carola Bott (born 9 July 1984) is a German female badminton player. In 2003, she won bronze medal at the European Junior Badminton Championships in girls' doubles event with Karin Schnaase.

Achievements

European Junior Championships
Girls' Doubles

BWF International Challenge/Series 
Women's singles

Women's doubles

  BWF International Challenge tournament
  BWF International Series tournament

References

External links
 
 
 

1984 births
Living people
People from Aschaffenburg
Sportspeople from Lower Franconia
German female badminton players
European Games competitors for Germany
Badminton players at the 2015 European Games